Kati Venäläinen-Sundqvist (born Kati Sundqvist on February 15, 1975 in Noormarkku, Satakunta) is a Finnish cross-country skier who has competed since 1995. She won a silver medal in the individual sprint at the 2001 FIS Nordic World Ski Championships in Lahti.

Sundqvist's best individual finish at the Winter Olympics was 16th in the 5 km + 5 km combined pursuit at Salt Lake City in 2002. She has five individual career victories up to 10 km from 2002 to 2005.

Cross-country skiing results
All results are sourced from the International Ski Federation (FIS).

Olympic Games

World Championships
 1 medal – (1 silver)

a.  Cancelled due to extremely cold weather.

World Cup

Season standings

Individual podiums

1 podium

Team podiums
2 podiums – (2 )

References

External links

1975 births
Living people
People from Noormarkku
Finnish female cross-country skiers
Cross-country skiers at the 1998 Winter Olympics
Cross-country skiers at the 2002 Winter Olympics
Cross-country skiers at the 2006 Winter Olympics
Olympic cross-country skiers of Finland
FIS Nordic World Ski Championships medalists in cross-country skiing
Sportspeople from Satakunta
20th-century Finnish women